The Scotland women's national sevens team is a minor rugby sevens team. They regularly compete at the Europe Women's Sevens.

History 
Scott Wight was appointed as head coach in 2017. Scotland competed at the 2013 Rugby World Cup Sevens Final Qualifier but did not qualify. Scotland were invited to the final leg of the 2018–19 World Rugby Women's Sevens Series in Biarritz, they placed eleventh in the tournament.

Scotland qualified for the 2022 Commonwealth Games and will be making their debut since the introduction of the women’s competition at the 2018 Games.

Players

Recent squad 
Scotland's sevens squad to the 2022 Commonwealth Games.
Head coach: Scott Forrest

Previous squads 
Squad to 2013 Rugby World Cup Sevens Final Qualifier 
Elizabeth Louise Dalgliesh
Evy Therese Forsberg
Ruth Slaven 
Laura Steven 
Megan Gaffney 
Lisa Martin 
Sarah Dixon 
Katy Green 
Annabel Sergeant 
Stephannie Johnston 
Lauren Harris 
Sarah Law

Records

Commonwealth Games

See also
 Scotland national rugby sevens team
 Scotland women's national rugby union team

References

External links
 

national
Women's national rugby sevens teams
W